The internal limiting membrane, or inner limiting membrane, is the boundary between the retina and the vitreous body, formed by astrocytes and the end feet of Müller cells.  It is separated from the vitreous body by a basal lamina.

External links
 

Human eye anatomy